SECURA Insurance is a mutual insurance company in the United States that offers property and casualty insurance through independent insurance agents in 14 states. The company focuses on insurance for businesses, homes and autos, farms, non-profit organizations, and special events. The company headquarters is located in Fox Crossing, Wisconsin, with an additional office located in Middleton, Wisconsin. SECURA employs approximately 700 people.

History
SECURA was founded in 1900 after a massive cyclone tore through New Richmond, Wisconsin, destroying homes and businesses, killing more than 100 people, and injuring 500
others. To protect themselves and each other, 135 charter members in the Cicero Township developed The Farmers Home Mutual Hail, Tornado, and Cyclone Insurance Company of Seymour, Wisconsin. 

In 1986, this insurance company was renamed SECURA.

Recognition
“A”(Excellent) rating from A.M. Best.
Ranked by independent agents as a top ten performer for Making Business Easier every year since 2006. (2006–2015)
 Platinum Well Workplace Award winner by Wellness Council of America (WELCOA)

Community involvement
SECURA supports a variety of community organizations by volunteering to serve on boards and committees, and by participating in fundraising efforts.

References

External links
SECURA Insurance website

Companies based in Wisconsin
Financial services companies established in 1900
Insurance companies of the United States
Mutual insurance companies
1900 establishments in Wisconsin